SOHO 3Q is a prime community-focused, shared office space in China managed by SOHO China. It is headquartered at Chaowai SOHO in Beijing, China. As of June 2019, the coworking space had 30 spaces in China.

History 
3Q is a new project developed by the real estate company SOHO China. Although the company was founded in 1995, it underwent a fundamental paradigm shift in 2012 from a build-to-sell to a build-to-hold business strategy. This change was partly in response to the changing situation of the real estate market in China and there were calls within the company to consider new projects to remain competitive. According to the CEO, the company first contemplated the idea of a co-working space in August 2014 in line with other companies in the sharing economy such as Airbnb and Uber.

By 2016, 3Q had expanded across China from two locations and 1,500 desks to more than 10,000 desks in 11 locations in Beijing and Shanghai. The space hosts a range of Chinese firms such as LeTV and Meituan. The company maintained that demand for such flexible office spaces will remain strong due to China's culture of technological innovation and entrepreneurship and younger generations of Chinese entrepreneurs who were educated in the West.

After detailed research on 30 internet companies, real estate tycoon and company chairman, Pan Shiyi announced the 3Q project in January 2015. Considered to be "Act 3" for the company, the initiative is meant to also cater to a large number of small- and medium-sized companies that no longer rent long-term office space and instead prefer to rent for a week, a month or half a year. The first two spaces - Wangjing 3Q in Beijing and Fuxing 3Q in Shanghai opened on February 1, 2016.

SOHO China has chosen the firm anySCALE Architecture Design for the interior design and CI of the first two spaces. At that time, 3Q become the largest coworking space in China with about 1500 seats and spurred the subsequent growth of a range of local coworking spaces and options.

In April 2016, Guanghualu II 3Q opened in CBD Beijing with more than 3000 seats, and Guanghualu II is the largest space of 3Q as the brand's flagship store.

As of 2019, SOHO China has opened 30 spaces, 25 of which were designed by any SCALE Architecture Design firm.

Architecture and design 
3Q's parent company is known for its architectural design and for transforming Beijing's skyline with universally recognizable SOHO buildings. Wangjing SOHO, one of the first 3Q spaces, was designed by Zaha Hadid Architects and led by the Pritzker prize-winning architect and founder Zaha Hadid. The building, which is LEED-certified and is meant to look like a small mountain range, designates some of the middle floors to 3Q coworking, occupying 6,000 square meters. Each seat is rented at 1,000 yuan ($160) per desk per week. Another early building, Fuxing 3Q, was designed by German GMP Architecture and one of the building's lobbies was designed by the Dutch AIM Architecture, the interior design of the Fuxing 3Q was designed by any scale Architecture Design Firm, and opened with a price of 560 yuan ($93) per desk per week. 

Guanghualu SOHO II building was designed by German GMP Architecture, hosting the largest 3Q Space with about 21,000 square meters of floor space and containing over 3300 desks. The space was initially meant to be a large shopping mall but was converted into a massive coworking space by the architectural firm AIM. Distinctive features of this central 3Q include a giant oak staircase that frames a venue for events and lectures and a second atrium called The Park, a common meeting spot surrounded by standing bamboo and glass meeting rooms.

More than 80% of all 3Q projects are housed in the existing SOHO properties. The main kinds of property are shopping malls, office towers, and mix-use buildings. SOHO China chooses to refurbish shopping malls, office towers,  food courts, and underground leftovers into coworking spaces.

Facilities 
3Q provides both private offices and individual workstations in an open-office layout. Tenants are allowed to rent individual desks on a weekly basis. Additional services available to tenants include free WIFI, conference rooms, printing machines, and phone booths. 3Q also organizes events such as "Pan's Dialogue", where chairman Pan Shiyi discusses entrepreneurship with well-known business personalities such as Xiaomi's Chairman Lei Jun, and entrepreneur Kai-Fu Lee.

Offices may be booked via the 3Q mobile application or in person. The app can also be used to book a tour, reserve a desk or a conference room, extend leases, and make payments.

References

Office buildings in Beijing
SOHO China